The exploration of Uranus has, to date, been through telescopes and a lone probe by NASA's Voyager 2 spacecraft, which made its closest approach to Uranus on January 24, 1986. Voyager 2 discovered 10 moons, studied the planet's cold atmosphere, and examined its ring system, discovering two new rings. It also imaged Uranus' five large moons, revealing that their surfaces are covered with impact craters and canyons.

A number of dedicated exploratory missions to Uranus have been proposed, but  none have been approved.

Voyager 2

Voyager 2 made its closest approach to Uranus on January 24, 1986, coming within  of the planet's cloud tops. This was the probe's first solo planetary flyby, since Voyager 1 ended its tour of the outer planets at Saturn's moon Titan.

Uranus is the third-largest planet in the Solar System. The length of a day on Uranus as measured by Voyager 2 is 17 hours and 14 minutes. Uranus is distinguished by the fact that it is tipped on its side. Its unusual position is thought to be the result of a collision with a planet-sized body early in the Solar System's history. Given its odd orientation, with its polar regions exposed to sunlight or darkness for long periods and Voyager 2 set to arrive around the time of Uranus's solstice, scientists were not sure what to expect at Uranus.

The presence of a magnetic field at Uranus was not known until Voyager 2 arrival. The intensity of the field is roughly comparable to that of Earth's, though it varies much more from point to point because of its large offset from the center of Uranus. The peculiar orientation of the magnetic field suggests that the field is generated at an intermediate depth in the interior where the pressure is high enough for water to become electrically conductive. Voyager 2 found that one of the most striking influences of the sideways position of the planet is its effect on the tail of the magnetic field, which is itself tilted 60 degrees from the planet's axis of rotation. The magnetotail was shown to be twisted by the planet's rotation into a long corkscrew shape behind the planet.

Radiation belts at Uranus were found to be of an intensity similar to those at Saturn. The intensity of radiation within the belts is such that irradiation would quickly darken (within 100,000 years) any methane trapped in the icy surfaces of the inner moons and ring particles. This may have contributed to the darkened surfaces of the moons and ring particles, which are almost uniformly gray in color.

A high layer of haze was detected around the sunlit pole, which also was found to radiate large amounts of ultraviolet light, a phenomenon dubbed "electroglow". Surprisingly, the illuminated and dark poles, and most of the planet, show nearly the same temperature at the cloud tops.

Voyager 2 found 10 new moons, bringing the total number to 15 at the time.

The moon Miranda, innermost of the five large moons, was revealed to be one of the strangest bodies yet seen in the Solar System. One theory holds that Miranda may be a reaggregation of material from an earlier time when the moon was fractured by a violent impact.

The five large moons appear to be ice–rock conglomerates like the satellites of Saturn. Titania is marked by huge fault systems and canyons indicating some degree of geologic, probably tectonic, activity in its history. Ariel has the brightest and possibly youngest surface of all the Uranian moons and also appears to have undergone geologic activity that led to many fault valleys and what seem to be extensive flows of icy material. Little geologic activity has occurred on Umbriel or Oberon, judging by their old and dark surfaces.

All nine previously known rings were studied by the spacecraft and showed the Uranian rings to be distinctly different from those at Jupiter and Saturn. The ring system may be relatively young and did not form at the same time as Uranus. Particles that make up the rings may be remnants of a moon that was broken by a high-velocity impact or torn up by gravitational effects. Voyager 2 also discovered two new rings.

In March 2020, NASA astronomers reported the detection of a large atmospheric magnetic bubble, also known as a plasmoid, released into outer space from the planet Uranus, after reevaluating old data recorded by the Voyager 2 space probe during a flyby of the planet in 1986.

Proposed missions

A number of missions to Uranus have been proposed. Scientists from the Mullard Space Science Laboratory in the United Kingdom have proposed the joint NASA–ESA Uranus Pathfinder mission to Uranus. A call for a medium-class (M-class) mission to the planet to be launched in 2022 was submitted to the ESA in December 2010 with the signatures of 120 scientists from across the globe. The ESA caps the cost of M-class missions at €470 million.

In 2009, a team of planetary scientists from NASA's Jet Propulsion Laboratory advanced possible designs for a solar-powered Uranus orbiter. The most favorable launch window for such a probe would have been in August 2018, with arrival at Uranus in September 2030. The science package would have included magnetometers, particle detectors and, possibly, an imaging camera.

In 2011, the United States National Research Council recommended a Uranus orbiter and probe as the third priority for a NASA Flagship mission by the NASA Planetary Science Decadal Survey.
However, this mission was considered to be lower-priority than future missions to Mars and the Jovian System, which would later become Mars 2020 and Europa Clipper.

A mission to Uranus is one of several proposed uses under consideration for the unmanned variant of NASA's heavy-lift Space Launch System (SLS) currently in development. The SLS would reportedly be capable of launching up to 1.7 metric tons to Uranus.

In 2013, it was proposed to use an electric sail (E-Sail) to send an atmospheric entry probe to Uranus.

In 2015 NASA announced it had begun a feasibility study into the possibility of orbital missions to Uranus and Neptune, within a budget of $2 billion in 2015 dollars. According to NASA's planetary science director Jim Green, who initiated the study, such missions would launch in the late 2020s at the earliest, and would be contingent upon their endorsement by the planetary science community, as well as NASA's ability to provide nuclear power sources for the spacecraft. Conceptual designs for such a mission are currently being analyzed.

MUSE, conceived in 2012 and proposed in 2015, is a European concept for a dedicated mission to the planet Uranus to study its atmosphere, interior, moons, rings, and magnetosphere. It is suggested to be launched with an Ariane 5 rocket in 2026, arriving at Uranus in 2044, and operating until 2050.

In 2016, another mission concept was conceived, called Origins and Composition of the Exoplanet Analog Uranus System (OCEANUS), and it was presented in 2017 as a potential contestant for a future New Frontiers program mission.

Future launch windows are available between 2030 and 2034.

China plans to send its first exploration mission to Uranus in 2046 as part of its Tianwen program.

References

Bibliography

External links
 NASA Voyager website

Uranus
Spaceflight
Discovery and exploration of the Solar System